Balochi or Baluchi is an Iranian language spoken primarily in the Balochistan region of Pakistan, Iran and Afghanistan. In addition, there are speakers in Oman, the Arab states of the Persian Gulf, Turkmenistan, East Africa and in diaspora communities in other parts of the world. The total number of speakers, according to Ethnologue, is  million. Of these, 6.28 million are in Pakistan.

According to Brian Spooner,

Balochi belongs to the Western Iranian subgroup, and its original homeland is suggested to be around the central Caspian region.

Classification 
Balochi is an Indo-European language, belonging to the Indo-Iranian branch of the family. As an Iranian language it is classified in the Northwestern group. Glottolog classifies 3 different varieties, namely Eastern Balochi, Koroshi and Southern-Western Balochi, under the "Balochic" group.

Phonology

Vowels 
The Balochi vowel system has at least eight vowels: five long and three short. The short vowels have more centralized phonetic quality than the long vowels.

Consonants 
The following table shows consonants which are common to both Western (Northern) and Southern Balochi. The consonants /s/, /z/, /n/, /ɾ/ and /l/ are articulated as alveolar in Western Balochi. The plosives /t/ and /d/ are dental in both dialects.

In addition,  occurs in a few words in Southern Balochi.

Grammar 
The normal word order is subject–object–verb. Like many other Indo-Iranian languages, Balochi also features split ergativity. The subject is marked as nominative except for the past tense constructions where the subject of a transitive verb is marked as oblique and the verb agrees with the object. Balochi, like many Western Iranian languages, has lost the Old Iranian gender distinctions.

Numerals 
Much of the Balochi number system is identical to Persian. According to Mansel Longworth Dames, Balochi writes the first twelve numbers as follows:

Notes

Dialects 
There are two main dialects: the dialect of the Mandwani (northern) tribes and the dialect of the Domki (southern) tribes. The dialectal differences are not very significant. One difference is that grammatical terminations in the northern dialect are less distinct compared with those in the southern tribes. An isolated dialect is Koroshi, which is spoken in the Qashqai tribal confederation in the Fars province. Koroshi distinguishes itself in grammar and lexicon among Balochi varieties.
Main Balochi language  is the main type of Balochi language that Balochi writers used this dialect for writing and most used words is in Balochi and not loan words, for first time Sayad Zahoor Shah Hashmi used this and write books in Main Balochi, and other dialects like southern, eastern and northern just used for speaking and not used for writing, Balochi Academy Sarbaz has working on a Standard Alphabetic system that they want to grow up Main Balochi language as one

Writing system 
Balochi was not a written language before the 19th century, and the Persian script was used to write Balochi wherever necessary. However, Balochi was still spoken at the Baloch courts.

British colonial officers first wrote Balochi with the Latin script. Following the creation of Pakistan, Baloch scholars adopted the Persian alphabet. The first collection of poetry in Balochi, Gulbang by Mir Gul Khan Nasir was published in 1951 and incorporated the Arabic Script. It was much later that Sayad Zahoor Shah Hashemi wrote a comprehensive guidance on the usage of Arabic script and standardized it as the Balochi Orthography in Pakistan and Iran. This earned him the title of the 'Father of Balochi'. His guidelines are widely used in Eastern and Western Balochistan. In Afghanistan, Balochi is still written in a modified Arabic script based on Persian.

In 2002, a conference was held to help standardize the script that would be used for Balochi.

Old Balochi Alphabet 
 

The following alphabet was used by Syed Zahoor Shah Hashmi in his lexicon of Balochi Sayad Ganj (lit. Sayad's Treasure). Until the creation of the Balochi Standard Alphabet, it was by far the most widely used alphabet for writing Balochi, and is still used very frequently.

Standard Perso-Arabic Alphabet 

The Balochi Standard Alphabet, standardized by Balochi Academy Sarbaz, consists of 29 letters. It is an extension of the Perso-Arabic script and borrows a few glyphs from Urdu. It is also sometimes referred to as Balo-Rabi or Balòrabi. Today, it is the preferred script to use in a professional setting and by educated folk.

Latin alphabet 
The following Latin-based alphabet was adopted by the International Workshop on "Balochi Roman Orthography" (University of Uppsala, Sweden, 28–30 May 2000).

Alphabetical order

 (33 letters and 2 digraphs)

References

Bibliography

Further reading 

Dictionaries and lexicographical works
 Gilbertson, George W. 1925. English-Balochi colloquial dictionary. Hertford: Stephen Austin & Sons.
 Ahmad, K. 1985. Baluchi Glossary: A Baluchi-English Glossary: Elementary Level. Dunwoody Press.
 Badal Khan, S. 1990. Mán Balócíá Darí Zubánání Judá. Labzánk Vol. 1(3): pp. 11–15.
 Abdulrrahman Pahwal. 2007. Balochi Gálband: Balochi/Pashto/Dari/English Dictionary. Peshawar: Al-Azhar Book Co. p. 374.
 Mír Ahmad Dihání. 2000. Mír Ganj: Balócí/Balócí/Urdú. Karachi: Balóc Ittihád Adabí Akedimí. p. 427.
 Bruce, R. I. 1874. Manual and Vocabulary of the Beluchi Dialect. Lahore: Government Civil Secretariat Press. vi 154 p.
 Ishák Xámúś. 2014. Balochi Dictionary: Balochi/Urdu/English. Karachi: Aataar Publications. p. 444.
 Nágumán. 2011. Balócí Gál: Ambáre Nókáz (Balochi/English/Urdu). Básk. p. 245.
 Nágumán. 2014. Jutgál. Makkurán: Nigwar Labzánkí Majlis. p. 64.
 Ghulám Razá Azarlí. 2016. Farhange Kúcak: Pársí/Balúcí. Pársí Anjuman.
 Hashmi, S. Z. S. 2000. Sayad Ganj: Balochi-Balochi Dictionary. Karachi: Sayad Hashmi Academy. P. 887.
 Ulfat Nasím. 2005. Tibbí Lughat. Balócí Akademí. p. 260.
 Gulzár Xán Marí. 2005. Gwaśtin. Balócí Akedimí. p. 466.
 Raśíd Xán. 2010. Batal, Guśtin, Puźdánk, Ghanŧ. Tump: Wafá Labzání Majlis. p. 400.
 Śe Ragám. 2012. Batal, Gwaśtin u Gálband. Balócí Akademí. p. 268.
 Abdul Azíz Daolatí Baxśán. 1388. Nám u Ném Nám: Farhang Námhá Balúcí. Tihrán: Pázína. p. 180.
 Nazeer Dawood. 2007. Balochi into English Dictionary. Gwádar: Drad Publications. p. 208.
 Abdul Kaiúm Balóc. 2005. Balócí Búmíá. Balócí Akademí. p. 405.
 Ján Mahmad Daśtí. 2015. Balócí Labz Balad [Balochi/Balochi Dictionary]. Balócí Akademí. p. 1255.
 Bogoljubov, Mixail, et al. (eds.). Indoiranskoe jazykoznanie i tipologija jazykovyx situacij. Sbornik statej k 75-letiju professora A. L. Gryunberga. St. Pétersbourg (Nauka). pp. 201–212.
 Marri, M. K. and Marri, S. K. 1970. Balúcí-Urdú Lughat. Quetta: Balochi Academy. 332 p.
 Mayer, T. J. L. 1900. English-Baluchi Dictionary. Lahore: Government Press.

Orthography
 Jahani, Carina. 1990. Standardization and orthography in the Balochi language. Studia Iranica Upsaliensia. Uppsala, Sweden: Almqvist & Wiksell Internat.
 Sayad Háśumí. 1964. Balócí Syáhag u Rást Nibíssag. Dabai: Sayad Háśumí Balóc. p. 144.
 Ghaos Bahár. 1998. Balócí Lékwaŕ. Balócí Akademí. p. 227.
 Ziá Balóc. 2015. Balócí Rást Nibíssí. Raísí Cáp u Śingjáh. p. 264.
 Axtar Nadím. 1997. Nibiśta Ráhband. Balócí Akedimí. p. 206.
 Táj Balóc. 2015. Sarámad (Roman Orthography). Bahren: Balóc Kalab. p. 110.

Courses and study guides
 Barker, Muhammad A. and Aaqil Khan Mengal. 1969. A course in Baluchi. Montreal: McGill University.
 Collett, Nigel A. 1986. A Grammar, Phrase-book, and Vocabulary of Baluchi (As Spoken in the Sultanate of Oman). Abingdon: Burgess & Son.
 Natawa, T. 1981. Baluchi (Asian and African Grammatical Manuals 17b). Tokyo. 351 p.
 Munazzih Batúl Baóc. 2008. Ásán Balúcí Bólcál. Balócí Akademí. p. 152.
 Abdul Azíz Jázimí. Balócí Gappe Káidaián. p. 32.
 Muhammad Zarrín Nigár. Dastúr Tatbíkí Zabáne Balúcí bá Fársí. Íránśahr: Bunyáde Naśre Farhange Balóc. p. 136.
 Gilbertson, George W. 1923. The Balochi language. A grammar and manual. Hertford: Stephen Austin & Sons.
 Bugti, A. M. 1978. Balócí-Urdú Bólcál. Quetta: Kalat Publications.
 Ayyúb Ayyúbí. 1381. Dastúr Zabán Fársí bih Balúcí. Íránśahr: Intiśárát Asátír. p. 200.
 Hitturam, R. B. 1881. Biluchi Nameh: A Text-book of the Biluchi Language. Lahore.

Etymological and historical studies
 Elfenbein, J. 1985. Balochi from Khotan. In: Studia Iranica. Vol. XIV (2): 223–238.
 Gladstone, C. E. 1874. Biluchi Handbook. Lahore.
 Hashmi, S. Z. S. 1986. Balúcí Zabán va Adab kí Táríx [The History of Balochi language and Literature: A Survey]. Karachi: Sayad Hashmi Academy.
 Korn, A. 2005. Towards a Historical Grammar of Balochi. Studies in Balochi Historical Phonology and Vocabulary [Beiträge zur Iranistik 26]. Wiesbaden (Reichert).
 Korn, A. 2009. The Ergative System in Balochi from a Typological Perspective // Iranian Journal for Applied Language Studies I. pp. 43–79.
 Korn, A. 2003. The Outcome of Proto-Iranian *ṛ in Balochi // Iran : Questions et connaissances. Actes du IVe congrès européen des études iraniennes, organisé par la Societas Iranologica Europaea, Paris, 6-10 septembre 1999. III : Cultures et sociétés contemporaines, éd. Bernard HOURCADE [Studia Iranica Cahier 27]. Leuven (Peeters). pp. 65–75.
 Mengal, A. K. 1990. A Persian-Pahlavi-Balochi Vocabulary I (A-C). Quetta: Balochi Academy.
 Morgenstiene, G. 1932. Notes on Balochi Etymology. Norsk Tidsskrift for Sprogvidenskap. p. 37–53.
 Moshkalo, V. V. 1988. Reflections of the Old Iranian Preverbs on the Baluchi Verbs. Naples: Newsletter of Baluchistan Studies. No. 5: pp. 71–74.
 Moshkalo, V. V. 1991. Beludzskij Jazyk. In: Osnovy Iranskogo Jazykozanija. Novoiranskie Jazyki I. Moscow. p. 5-90.

Dialectology
 Dames, M. L. 1881. A Sketch of the Northern Balochi Language. Calcutta: The Journal of the Asiatic Society of Bengal.
 Elfenbein, J. 1966. The Baluchi Language. A Dialectology with Text. London.
 Filipone, E. 1990. Organization of Space: Cognitive Models and Baluchi Dialectology. Newsletter of Baluchistan Studies. Naples. Vol. 7: pp. 29–39.
 Gafferberg, E. G. 1969. Beludzhi Turkmenskoi. SSR: Ocherki Khoziaistva Material'oni Kultuy I Byta. sn.
 Geiger, W. 1889. Etymologie des Baluci. Abhandlungen der I. Classe derKoniglich Bayersichen Akaemie der Wissenschaften. Vol. XIX(I): pp. 105–53.
 Marston, E. W. 1877. Grammar and Vocabulary of the Mekranee Beloochee Dialect. Bombay.
 Pierce, E. 1874. A Description of the Mekranee-Beloochee Dialect. Journal of the Royal Asiatic Society. Vol. XI: 1-98.
 Pierce, E. 1875. Makrani Balochi. Journal of the Royal Asiatic Society. 11: N. 31.
 Rossi, A. V. 1979. Phonemics in Balochi and Modern Dialectology. Naples: Instituto Universitario Orientale, Dipartimento di Studi Asiatici. Iranica, pp. 161–232.
 Rahman, T. 1996. The Balochi/Brahvi Language Movements in Pakistan. Journal of South Asian and Middle Eastern Studies. Vol. 19(3): 71–88.
 Rahman, T. 2001. The Learning of Balochi and Brahvi in Pakistan. Journal of South Asian and Middle Eastern Studies. Vol. 24(4): 45–59.
 Rahman, T. 2002. Language Teaching and Power in Pakistan. Indian Social Science Review. 5(1): 45–61.

Language contact
 Elfenbein, J. 1982. Notes on the Balochi-Brahui Linguistic Commensality. In: TPhS, pp. 77–98.
 Foxton, W. 1985. Arabic/Baluchi Bilingualism in Oman. Naples: Newsletter of Baluchistan Studies. N. 2 pp. 31–39.
 Natawa, T. 1970. The Baluchis in Afghanistan and their Language. pp. II:417-18. In: Endo, B. et al. Proceedings, VIIIth International Congress of Anthropological and Ethnological Sciences, 1968, Tokyo and Kyoto. Tokyo: Science Council of Japan.
 Rzehak, L. 1995. Menschen des Ruckens-Menschen des Baluches: Sprache und Wirklicheit im Verwandtschaftssystem der Belutschen. pp. 207–229. In: Reck, C. & Zieme, P. (ed.); Iran und Turfan. Wiesbaden: Harrassowitz.
 Elfenbein, Josef. 1997. "Balochi Phonology". In Kaye, Alan S. Phonologies of Asia and Africa. 1. pp. 761–776.
 Farideh Okati. 2012. The Vowel Systems of Five Iranian Balochi Dialects. Acta Universitatis Upsaliensis: Studia linguistica Upsaliensia. p. 241.

Grammar and morphology
 Farrell, Tim. 1989. A study of ergativity in Balochi.' M.A. thesis: School of Oriental & African Studies, University of London.
 Farrell, Tim. 1995. Fading ergativity? A study of ergativity in Balochi. In David C. Bennett, Theodora Bynon & B. George Hewitt (eds.), Subject, voice, and ergativity: Selected essays, 218–243. London: School of Oriental and African Studies, University of London.
 Korn, Agnes. 2009. Marking of arguments in Balochi ergative and mixed constructions. In Simin Karimi, VIda Samiian & Donald Stilo (eds.) Aspects of Iranian Linguistics, 249–276. Newcastle upon Tyne (UK): Cambridge Scholars Publishing.
 Abraham, W. 1996. The Aspect-Case Typology Correlation: Perfectivity Triggering Split Ergativity. Folia Linguistica Vol. 30 (1-2): pp. 5–34.
 Ahmadzai, N. K. B. M. 1984. The Grammar of Balochi Language. Quetta: Balochi Academy, iii, 193 p.
 Andronov, M. S. 2001. A Grammar of the Balochi Language in Comparative Treatment. Munich.
 Bashir, E. L. 1991. A Contrastive Analysis of Balochi and Urdu. Washington, D.C. Academy for Educational Development, xxiii, 333 p.
 Jahani, C. 1994. Notes on the Use of Genitive Construction Versus Izafa Construction in Iranian Balochi. Studia Iranica. Vol. 23(2): 285–98.
 Jahani, C. 1999. Persian Influence on Some Verbal Constructions in Iranian Balochi. Studia Iranica. Vol. 28(1): 123–143.
 Korn, A. 2008. A New Locative Case in Turkmenistan Balochi // Iran and the Caucasus 12. pp. 83–99.
 Leech, R. 1838. Grammar of the Balochky Language. Journal of the Royal Asiatic Society. Vol. VII(2): p. 608.
 Mockler, E. 1877. Introduction to a Grammar of the Balochee Language. London.
 Nasir, K. A. B. M. 1975. Balócí Kárgónag. Quetta.
 Sabir, A. R. 1995. Morphological Similarities in Brahui and Balochi Languages. International Journal of Dravidian Linguistics. Vol. 24(1): 1–8.

Semantics
 Elfenbein, J. 1992. Measurement of Time and Space in Balochi. Studia Iranica, Vol. 21(2): pp. 247–254.
 Filipone, E. 1996. Spatial Models and Locative Expressions in Baluchi. Naples: Instituto Universitario Orietale, Dipartimento di Studi Asiatici. 427 p.

Miscellaneous and surveys
 Baloch, B. A. 1986. Balochi: On the Move. In: Mustada, Zubeida, ed. The South Asian Century: 1900–1999. Karachi: Oxford University Press. pp. 163–167.
 Bausani, A. 1971. Baluchi Language and Literature. Mahfil: A Quarterly of South Asian Literature, Vol. 7 (1-2): pp. 43–54.
 Munazzih Batúl Baóc. 2008. Ásán Balúcí Bólcál. Balócí Akademí. p. 633–644.
 Elfenbein, J. 1989. Balochi. In: SCHMITT, pp. 350–362.
 Geiger, W. 1901. Die Sprach der Balutschen. Geiger/Kuhn II, P. 231–248, Gelb, I. J. 1970. Makkan and Meluḫḫa in Early Mesopotamian Sources. Revue d'Assyriologie. Vol. LXIV: pp. 1–8.
 Gichky, N. 1986. Baluchi Language and its Early Literature. Newsletter of Baluchistan Studies. No. 3, pp. 17–24.
 Grierson, G. A. 1921. Balochi. In: Linguistic Survey of India X: Specimens of Languages of Eranian Family. Calcutta. pp. 327–451.
 Ibragimov, B. 1973. Beludzhi Pakistana. Sots.-ekon. Polozhenie v Pakist. Beludhistane I nats. dvizhnie beludzhei v 1947–1970. Moskva. 143 p.
 Jaffrey, A. A. 1964. New Trends in the Balochi Language. Bulletin of the Ancient Iranian Cultural Society. Vol. 1(3): 14–26.
 Jahani, C. Balochi. In: Garry, J. and Rubino, C. (eds.). Facts About World's Languages. New York: H. W. Wilson Company. pp. 59–64.
 Kamil Al-Qadri, S. M. 1969. Baluchi Language and Literature. Pakistan Quarterly. Vol. 17: pp. 60–65.
 Morgenstiene, G. 1969. The Baluchi Language. Pakistan Quarterly. Vol. 17: 56–59.
 Nasir, G. K. 1946. Riyásat Kalát kí Kaumí Zabán. Bolan.
 Rooman, A. 1967. A Brief Survey of Baluchi Literature and Language. Journal of the Pakistan Historical Society. Vol. 15: 253–272.
 Rossi, A. V. 1982–1983. Linguistic Inquiries in Baluchistan Towards Integrated Methodologies. Naples: Newsletter of Baluchistan Studies. N.1: 51–66.
 Zarubin, I. 1930. Beitrage zin Stadium von Sprache und Folklore der Belutschen. Zapiski Kollegii Vostokovedov. Vol. 5: 653–679.

External links 

 
 Collett, N. A. A grammar, phrase book and vocabulary of Baluchi: (as spoken in the Sultanate of Oman). 2nd ed. [Camberley]: [N.A. Collett], 1986.
 Dames, Mansel Longworth. A sketch of the northern Balochi language, containing a grammar, vocabulary and specimens of the language. Calcutta: Asiatic Society, 1881.
 Mumtaz Ahmad. Baluchi glossary: a Baluchi-English glossary: elementary level. Kensington, Md.: Dunwoody Press, 1985.
 EuroBalúči online translation tool – translate Balochi words to or from English, Persian, Spanish, Finnish and Swedish
 iJunoon English to Balochi Dictionary
 EuroBalúči – Baluchi alphabet, grammar and music
 
Jahani, C. 2019. A Grammar of Modern Standard Balochi

 
Languages of Pakistan
Arabic alphabets for South Asian languages